Ajeé Wilson (born May 8, 1994) is an American middle-distance runner who specializes in the 800 meters. She is the 2022 World indoor champion at the 800 meter distance, after earning silver medals in 2016 and 2018. Wilson won bronze medals at both the 2017 and 2019 World Athletics Championships. She is the second-fastest American of all time in the event with a time of 1m 55.61s, and she holds North American indoor record.

Wilson won titles in the 800 m at both the 2011 World Youth Championships and 2012 World Junior Championships. Her winning time of 2:00.91 at the latter is the third-fastest time run by a high schooler behind Mary Cain and Kim Gallagher.

Personal life
Wilson attended Academy of Allied Health & Science in Neptune Township, New Jersey, until 2012. She originally committed to attend Florida State University, before deciding to turn professional. She graduated from Temple University in 2016, but trains with her coach Derek Thompson and the Juventus Track Club of Philadelphia.

Career

2013
In 2012, she committed to run for the Florida State Seminoles under Karen Harvey, but days before the fall semester, she decided to focus on a pro career and return to her coach Derek Thompson at Temple University. The decision paid off at the IAAF Moscow  2013 World Championships where she ran the quickest junior 800m of 1:58.21 – a North American and USA junior record – to place fifth.

2014
Wilson won her Second U.S. Senior Indoor 800-meter title at the 2014 USA Indoor Track and Field Championships in Albuquerque, New Mexico, in 2:00.43.
Wilson won her first U.S. Senior Outdoor 800-meter title at the 2014 USA Outdoor Track and Field Championships in Sacramento, California, in 1:58.70.
On July 18, Wilson ran a world leading mark of 1:57.67 to win the Diamond League Herculis Monaco.

2015
Wilson won the Armory Invitational in 2:01.7 on January 31 in New York, New York.

At the USA Outdoor Track and Field Championships in Eugene, Oregon Wilson placed 3rd in the 800m in 2:00.05 despite losing a shoe in the last 200 meters.  She qualified to represent the U.S. for the 800m in the 2015 World Championships in Athletics in Beijing, China but did not compete due to injury.

2017
Wilson won the New York Road Runners Armory Invitational in New York, New York 600m in 1:24.28, the fourth-fastest time in history and the second-fastest by an American behind only Alysia Montaño‘s U.S. national record of 1:23.59 set on this same Armory oval in 2013.

At the USA Outdoor Track and Field Championships in Sacramento, Wilson placed 1st in the 800 meters in 1:57.78, to represent the U.S. for the 800m in the 2017 World Championships in Athletics in London.

On July 21, 2017, Wilson ran 1:55.61 at the Diamond League event in Monaco to break the U.S. record by nearly 1 second.  This time ranks Wilson at number 20 on the IAAF all-time list.

2018
Wilson won silver medal in World Indoor Championships at 800 m.

Wilson was part of the Team USA squad setting a world indoor record in the 4x800m relay on February 3 at the 2018 Millrose Games in 8:05.89 – a squad that featured Chrishuna Williams (2:05.10), Raevyn Rogers (2:00.45), Charlene Lipsey (2:01.98), Ajee' Wilson (1:58.37).

Wilson won 800 m gold at 2018 USA Indoor Track and Field Championships in Albuquerque, New Mexico, in 2:01.60, and USA Outdoor Track and Field Championships in 1:58.18.

Wilson won 800 m gold at 2018 NACAC Championships in Toronto, Canada, in a championship record and stadium record 1:57.52.

2019
Wilson won in 1:58.60 at 2019 Millrose Games to set the U.S. Indoor Track and Field 800 m record & NACAC 800 m record.

On July 28, at the USA Outdoor Track and Field Championships in Des Moines, Wilson placed 1st in the 800 meters in 1:57.72, to represent the U.S. for the 800m in the 2019 World Championships in Athletics in Doha, Qatar.

Achievements

Major competition record

Circuit wins
  Diamond League champion 800 metres: 2019
 2014 (2) (800 m): London Grand Prix in Glasgow, Monaco Herculis
 2015 (1) (800 m): New York Grand Prix
 2019 (4) (800 m): Stockholm Bauhaus-galan, Monaco Herculis, Birmingham Grand Prix, Brussels Memorial Van Damme
 2022 (1) (800 m): Kamila Skolimowska Memorial
 World Continental Tour Gold level
 2022 (1) (800 m): USATF Bermuda Games

National Championships

Personal bests

References

External links

 
 
 
 
 
 
 
 

1994 births
Living people
American female middle-distance runners
Olympic track and field athletes of the United States
Athletes (track and field) at the 2016 Summer Olympics
World Athletics Championships athletes for the United States
World Athletics Championships medalists
Track and field athletes from New Jersey
People from Neptune Township, New Jersey
Sportspeople from Monmouth County, New Jersey
African-American female track and field athletes
World Athletics record holders (relay)
Diamond League winners
USA Indoor Track and Field Championships winners
USA Outdoor Track and Field Championships winners
Athletes (track and field) at the 2020 Summer Olympics
21st-century African-American sportspeople
21st-century African-American women
World Athletics Indoor Championships winners